The AN Railway  is one of several shortline railroad companies owned by the Genesee & Wyoming parent company. It operates between Port Saint Joe, Florida and a connection with the Florida Gulf & Atlantic Railroad at Chattahoochee, Florida. The railroad no longer reaches its namesake city of Apalachicola, Florida, as the rails have been removed between Franklin and Apalachicola.

History 
The original line was constructed by the Apalachicola Northern Railroad between 1905 and 1910. The Apalachicola Northern continued to operate it through various corporate reorganizations until 2002, when it leased the line to the Rail Management Corporation, which also acquired its locomotives, rolling stock, and railroad equipment. The new company began operating on September 1, 2002. Genesee & Wyoming acquired the Rail Management Corporation and its railroads in 2005.

Equipment
Unlike most shortlines, the AN Railway's locomotive fleet consisted entirely of originally purchased units direct from the manufacturer, as opposed to the purchasing of second-hand engines. Its diesel roster is primarily EMD hood units, although many of these locomotives were sold off after business on the railroad dropped with the closure of some industrial areas.

Current roster

Retired Roster

See also

 List of United States railroads
 List of Florida railroads
 Genesee & Wyoming
 Bay Line Railroad

References

External links
 
  – Photographs of the AN Railway

Florida railroads
Genesee & Wyoming
Railway companies established in 2002